is a dating sim video game targeted towards women and girls (an Otome game) released by Konami for the PlayStation 2 game console on June 20, 2002. It was also re-released with enhancements for the Nintendo DS as Tokimeki Memorial Girl's Side: 1st Love on February 15, 2007. It has three sequels: Tokimeki Memorial Girl's Side: 2nd Kiss, Tokimeki Memorial Girl's Side: 3rd Story, and Tokimeki Memorial Girl's Side: 4th Heart. Tokimeki Memorial Girl's Side is part of the Tokimeki Memorial series, which originated in 1994 as a male-oriented dating sim.

Game features
Although the Tokimeki Memorial series was originally male-oriented, this game is directed toward the female market and involves a female protagonist looking for love amongst a cast of male characters. Some modifications in game-play were also made to make the game more appealing to female gamers. The player is able to go shopping on her free days to buy clothes and is able to change her daily attire as well as dressing-up for a date. In addition to the male love-interest characters, there are also female characters who can become the player's friends, study together, go out for coffee, etc. These characters can also become love rivals. The parameters which are built up through different activities include academic ability, art, popularity, sport, attentiveness and beauty.

Among the changes in the Nintendo DS version there is a new character, Tendo, and new features including a best friends scenario, skinship, and kiss endings. The best friends scenario involves a confession of love from a male best friend. The clothes have been switched to the more popular Tokimeki Memorial Girl's Side 2nd Kiss fashions. The second DS release, Tokimeki Memorial 1st Love Plus, added all the new features from Tokimeki Memorial Girl's Side 2nd Season, as well as compatibility with Nintendo DSi.

Game content
The game's main character is a student at the fictional private school, Habataki High School, located in the fictional city of Habataki. The protagonist has returned to Habataki after living away for a time due to her parents' work, but she lived there as a child. While leading a normal high school life including academics, club activities and part-time work, it is also possible to become friendly with boys who can make a declaration of love on graduation day.

Club activities
Clubs can involve both physical and academic activities. All activities increase attentiveness. Through prolonged participation in a club it's possible to become the club's leader and also to create related career opportunities for the future. Athletic clubs and the school band hold practice every third Sunday. If the player misses practice twice (once for the band), she is expelled. All clubs have a summer session in August, although the player doesn't interact with other club members then. The summer session will feature cooking duty, and the player will be able to cook a meal according to her attentiveness score.

Baseball Club
Wataru Hibiya is a member. Player joins as manager. Increases art and attentiveness.
Girls' Basketball Club
Practice is held at the same place as Boys' basketball. Possibility of meeting Kazuma Suzuka and Tamami Konno. 
Tennis Club
Mizuki Sudo is a member. Increases art and sport parameters.
Cheerleading Club
Natsumi Fujii is a member. Costs the most academic ability points of any activity. Cheer at both Baseball and Basketball practice. Increases beauty. 
Gardening Club
Sakuya Morimura is a member. Increases academic ability and art.
Art Club
Shiki Mihara is a member. Increases art and beauty.
Brass Band
Reiichi Himuro is the band's conductor as well as the faculty advisor for the club. Like athletic clubs it meets every 3rd Sunday. As Himuro is very strict, he will expel students who miss practice immediately. Art and academic ability are increased.
Handcrafts Club
Ikkaku Amanohashi will show up on the day the player cooks for the club during the summer session. Attentiveness, popularity and art parameters are strengthened. On the third year culture festival the club has a wedding dress fashion show. It has a reputation for being less demanding than other club activities.

Part-time work
If the player works at any one location for a long time, she will be offered a full-time position upon graduation.

Alucard Coffee Shop
Close to studio used by Kei Hazuki. He will also visit the coffee shop often. It increases all parameters.
Stallion Oil
This is a gas station and Madoka Kijo's part-time job.
Annery Flower Shop
Although this is Shiho Arisawa's part-time job, it increases popularity and decreases academic ability.
Winning Burger
Although this is Natsumi Fujii's part-time job it increases both academic ability and popularity.
Boutique Jess
Owned by Goro
Simone House of Goods
Owned by Goro
Game debugger
As it's difficult to get rid of all the bugs, stress accumulates quickly while all other parameters fall.

"Skinship" mode
As an added feature of the Nintendo DS version, the player can touch many of the characters using the stylus causing many different responses depending on their feelings for you (e.g. if Hibiya is on neutral, the players increase his love for them if they touch his arms and torso).

Best friends mode
Another addition to the Nintendo DS version. When there is more than one love interest, they get separate love and friendship 
parameters, when the love parameter reaches a certain level there is a possibility of a declaration of love. This feature was very 
well received by fans.

Legend
Like in other installments of the Tokimeki Memorial series, there is a legend. There is a fairy-tale story of a traveling prince who falls in love with a princess but are torn apart. The story is told by a young boy to the main character as a young girl in a church on the grounds of Habataki High School. The boy promises to one day return to that same place to declare his love.

Characters

Male characters
Kei Hazuki (葉月 珪)
 CV : Hikaru Midorikawa
The main male character, Hazuki is an honor student, an excellent athlete and a model. Perhaps because of this, his standards for a girlfriend are very high, and is a difficult catch. Although he appears cold, he shows his warm side through his fascination with cats. His grandfather is a German stained glass window maker. Hazuki has a tendency to fall asleep; however, during exams he gets very high scores. He appears to have few friends, but Morimura has been his friend since junior high school.

Sakuya Morimura (守村 桜弥)
 CV : Akira Ishida
Morimura is a kind-hearted honor student. He's the only son of a doctor, but as he is interested in plants wants to become a botanist. His way of thinking and plans for the future bring him into conflict with his father and his mother doesn't live with them. He's very knowledgeable on many subjects, and he often offers explanations on physics. His hobby is playing video games and is friendly with many people, including Reiichi Himuro and Ikkaku Amanohashi. He loves video games.

Kazuma Suzuka (鈴鹿 和馬)
 CV : Nobuyuki Hiyama
Suzuka is a typical jock. From the beginning of the first year he's a regular at the basketball club and his dream is to go to America on a basketball scholarship. He is very talented, but has a hard time playing as part of a team. He takes afterschool lessons together with Madoka Kijo and sometimes plays video games with Morimura.

Madoka Kijo (姫条 まどか) 
 CV : Ryōtarō Okiayu
Kijo is a dark-skinned boy originally from the Kansai area. His mother died and he does not get along with his father, so he now lives alone. He cooks for himself and even prepares the main character an Obento. He intends to become a "freeter" after graduation but also seems interested in working for a company. Madoka loves to cook and is a huge fan of bikes. He is friends with Morimura and Suzuka. He has several run-ins with Himuro due to his bad grades and conduct. He does not participate in any clubs since he has a part-time job at a Gasoline Station.

Shiki Mihara (三原 色)
 CV : Shin-ichiro Miki
Both of his parents are famous artists and he's considered an artistic genius. His works hang in the museum. He is a member of the arts club. He has a kind and sincere, though highly narcissistic, personality and loves beauty both in nature and in art. He loves bungee jumping and roller coasters.

Reiichi Himuro (氷室 零一)
 CV : Takehito Koyasu
Himuro is the player's homeroom teacher and is feared by his students. He enjoys driving and owns a Maserati. Himuro teaches mathematics. He has a tough and serious personality, and the students talk about him being an android built in the church basement. Despite of it, he has a soft side he reveals when he sleeps in, speeds while driving or goes to different events organized by his bartender friend. He appreciates horror movies. His name is a bit of a pun since the kanji could mean "ice room zero one".

Wataru Hibiya (日比谷 渉)
 CV : Kappei Yamaguchi
Hibiya is one grade below the main character and won't be able to meet him until the 2nd year. He aspires to be a good man, and admires Kei Hazuki. He even tries to be like him, but is very bad on it. He seems to dream of becoming a professional baseball player and to marry a female announcer. He shares an interest in pro wrestling with Suzuka and they watch videos together. He is a member of the baseball club.

Ikkaku Amanohashi (天之橋 一鶴)
 CV : Jūrōta Kosugi
Amanohashi is the school's chairman of the board of trustees who dreams of educating an ideal woman. He is wealthy and invites the students to the yearly Christmas party he holds at his residence. He's an old friend of fashion designer Goro Hanatsubaki. It is suggested that his father is an acquaintance of Hazuki's grandfather. He was instrumental in admitting Kijo into the school.

Chiharu Aoki (蒼樹 千晴)
 CV : Showtaro Morikubo
Aoki is a hidden character. After he sends the main character an e-mail by mistake they start corresponding. He's an American-born exchange student and at first he cannot speak Japanese. His Japanese improves gradually through his e-mails. He is, in fact a student at Kirameki High (the original Tokimeki Memorial's school) and is a member of the computer club. He has a kind personality. He goes shopping often and might accidentally bump into the main character at the mall.

Jin Tendo (天童 壬)
 CV : Sōichirō Hoshi
Tendo is an exclusive character of the Nintendo DS version and is the second hidden character. He meets the main character by chance. While he was a top student in junior high school, his grades have seriously declined in high school although they improve after studying together with the main character. He is a student at Hanegasaki High (the high school from Tokimeki Memorial Girl's Side: 2nd Kiss).

Goro Hanatsubaki (花椿 吾郎)
 CV : Shō Hayami
Goro is a well known fashion designer. He is a friend of Amanohashi. He is very eccentric and is known for his infamous snake dance.

Female characters
Shiho Arisawa (有沢 志穂)
 CV : Yukana
Arisawa is an honor student and has excellent academic abilities. She seems a bit cold and distant but is also very helpful. She enjoys writing poetry, and has a complex for being tall. She has a part-time job in a flower shop and has a crush on Morimura. If the main character dates him she becomes a rival instead of a friend. She plans on going on to a first-class university to study law. She is poor in sports and misses the sports festivals. She re-appears in Tokimeki Memorial Girl's Side: 2nd Kiss, when she is attending university and working in the same flower shop.

Mizuki Sudo (須藤 瑞希)
 CV : Ikue Ōtani
Sudo is the only child of a wealthy businessman and is always seen together with her butler, Garçon Ito. She has an egocentric personality and has few friends, but is actually quite lonely and very kind. She seems to have lived in France and mixes in French words in her speech. She is a member of the tennis club and is good friends with Mihara. She has interest in popular culture and enjoys watching popular dramas on TV. She plans on going as an exchange student to France after graduation.

Natsumi Fujii (藤井 奈津実)
 CV : Tomoko Kawakami
Fujii is an energetic and spontaneous girl. She's the type of person who acts before she thinks. She's Himuro's natural enemy and is constantly trying to play pranks on him. She's a member of the cheerleading club and works part-time at a fast food restaurant. She has a crush on Kijo. If the main character dates him she becomes a rival.

Tamami Konno (紺野 珠美)
 CV : Omi Minami
Konno has a quiet and shy personality. She held a record in swimming during junior high school. She has a younger brother who is a classmate of Tsukushi and catchable in the 3rd installment. Konno is the manager of the basketball club and is friendly with Suzuka. If the main character dates Suzuka she becomes a rival.

Other characters
Tsukushi (尽)
 CV : Ai Orikasa
Tsukushi is the main character's younger brother. Although he may be a little arrogant at times, he is concerned about his sister and will provide information about potential love interests. It is possible to visit him on free days.

Garçon Ito (ギャリソン伊藤)
 CV : Kōichi Kitamura
Ito is Mizuki Sudo's butler. He has taken care of her since she was small and is very emotionally attached to her.

Yoshihito Masuda (益田 義人)
 CV : Masaaki Ōkura
Masuda is a close friend of Reiichi Himuro from their student days who runs a Jazz bar. Although he appears only on a few occasions, he is a very popular character to the point of being the only secondary character to have inspired a Japanese phone card.

Church boy
 CV : Ayaka Saitō
A boy the main character remembers from her childhood.

See also
 Tokimeki Memorial
 List of Tokimeki Memorial series characters
 Tokimeki Memorial Only Love

References

External links 
Tokimeki Memorial Girl's Side Series Portal Site
Tokimeki MemorialGirl's Side (PS2)
Tokimeki Memorial Girl's Side 1st Love (Nintendo DS)
i-revo my portal-Tokimeki Memorial Girl's Side (Official user community)

2002 video games
Japan-exclusive video games
PlayStation 2 games
Nintendo DS games
Mobile games
Otome games
Tokimeki Memorial
Video games developed in Japan
Video games featuring female protagonists
Single-player video games